The Night Visitor (Swedish title: Papegojan) is a 1971 Swedish psychological thriller film in English, starring Max von Sydow, Liv Ullmann, Trevor Howard, Per Oscarsson, Rupert Davies and Andrew Keir, and directed by Laslo Benedek.

Plot
Salem is an insane asylum inmate after being forced to take an insanity plea when wrongly convicted of murdering his farmhand. Salem escapes confinement from the fortress-like asylum in the dead of winter. Driven insane from being institutionalized for the last two years, he reaches his family farm, now run by his younger sisters Emma and Ester and the latter's husband Dr. Anton Jenks, who accused Salem of the murder.

As revenge, Salem  kills the people he believes responsible for his unfair conviction and subsequent confinement. He starts with Emma, arranging the murder to appear that Anton is the killer. A local police inspector begins to see foul play and resolves to uncover the truth of the murders and Salem's conviction.

Salem has barrister Mr. Clemens as his next target. Following a visit from the inspector, the bedridden Clemens calls Anton to his home and confronts him about certain inaccuracies during the trial. Anton leaves after giving Clemens a sedative, and Salem enters his lawyer's room and kills him in his sleep with a lethal injection.

Salem proceeds to the farmhouse where he acquires a fur coat, biding his time as Ester called the inspector. Salem reveals that Anton murdered the farmhand when he caught him and Emma attempting to burn down the farmhouse which they could not sell because of Salem. After the police leave, Ester is cornered and hacked to pieces by Salem when she attempts to flee. Anton arrives as Salem proceeds to wipe the blood on the doctor's clothes before running back to the asylum. Broken, Anton confesses his crime to the inspector as he hurries to the asylum.

Salem manages to return to his cell before being discovered. But his alibi is ruined in a completely unexpected, spectacular way. This bang also forms the final punch line of the film.

Cast
 Max Von Sydow: Salem
 Trevor Howard: Inspector  
 Liv Ullmann: Ester Jenks
 Per Oscarsson: Anton Jenks
 Rupert Davies: Mr. Clemens  
 Andrew Keir: Dr. Kemp  
 Jim Kennedy: Carl  
 Arthur Hewlett: Pop  
 Hanne Bork: Emmie  
 Gretchen Franklin: Mrs. Hansen  
 Bjørn Watt-Boolsen: Mr. Torens
 Lotte Freddie: Britt Torens  
 Erik Kühnau: Police Doctor

Production
Christopher Lee was first choice to play Salem, but was not available.

The film is notable for its unusual score by renowned Hollywood film and TV composer Henry Mancini. The music was arranged for synthesizer, 12 woodwinds, organ, two pianos and two harpsichords and Mancini achieved an unsettling effect by having one of the harpsichords tuned a quarter-tone flat.

Release
The film was released theatrically in North America in 1971 by Universal Marion Corporation (UMC). It was re-released in 1981 under the title Lunatic by 21st Century Film Corporation.

The film was released on DVD by VCI Entertainment in February 2000. This version is currently out-of-print.

References

External links

1971 films
1970s psychological thriller films
English-language Swedish films
Films scored by Henry Mancini
Swedish films about revenge
Films directed by László Benedek
1970s English-language films
1970s Swedish films